Ethan Butera (born 16 April, 2006) is a Belgian professional footballer who plays as a defender for RSCA Futures in the Belgian Challenger Pro League.

Career
Butera has been with Anderlecht since under-11 level.  On 6 May 2021 Butera signed his first professional contract with Anderlecht. The contract runs until the conclusion of the 2023-24 season with the club’s Jean Kindermans describing him as a “strong left footed centre back who can also play in midfield, a natural leader with a bright future”. Butera made his debut in the Challenger Pro League on 14 August. 2022 in a 0-0 home draw against K.M.S.K. Deinze. Butera was identified as one of the core reasons RKSA Futures were the last unbeaten side in Belgian football during the 2022-23 season. Such was his form he was linked with potential transfers to Juventus, Ajax and Atalanta.

International career
In 2022 Butera represented Belgium at ‭under-17 level. Prior to this, he captained the Belgian under-16 team.

Personal life
He is the son of Belgian former professional footballer Jonathan Butera.

References

External links

2006 births
Living people
Belgian footballers
Belgium youth international footballers
Association football defenders
RSCA Futures players
Challenger Pro League players